Darren Tulett (born 2 June 1965) is an English journalist who became a sports anchorman, presenting mainly football on French television. He was a presenter for Canal+ for a decade, and has worked for beIN Sport since helping to launch the channel in 2012.

His presenting style is lighthearted and relaxed. Having become relatively famous in France - originally as the face of English football - he remains almost unknown in Britain, although he has been an occasional contributor to The Guardian newspaper.

Early life
Tulett was born in Shoreham-by-Sea, Sussex, and grew up in Lancing, attending Boundstone School. He took various jobs after leaving school, and then studied politics and social sciences at Manchester Polytechnic for a year.

After serving on the Students Union for a year, he quit his studies and worked for a year as a barman and for a local bookmaker. On the spur of the moment, Tulett agreed to go to France with a friend and he ended up teaching English in Paris for nearly six years. He wanted to become a journalist, returned to England and, somehow, landed a job with Bloomberg News in London as a sports reporter.

Football presenting
Bloomberg agreed to his request to report on the 1998 World Cup. He then remained in France, and reported for Bloomberg on football, the Tour de France and the French Open. He was also, briefly, on Europe 1 Sport, part of the Europe 1 radio network in France, talking about English football.

In 2002 he was signed up by Canal+ as a contributor on L'Équipe du Dimanche, a weekly show on football around Europe. Playing with his image as an English dandy and surfing on the popularity of Premier League football in France, Tulett was taken on full-time by Canal Plus in 2004. The first program he hosted, with Isabelle Moreau, was a light-hearted talk show called Fabulous Sport on Canal+. He reported in a lighthearted, colourful 1960s style, becoming known in France as "Darren d'Angleterre". (The Observer has called him "The French Alan Hansen", and The Daily Telegraph has called him "The Austin Powers of French Television"). Also on Canal+ he presented Match of ze day on English football (the name presumably derived from the BBC program Match of the Day with a stereotypical French pronunciation of "the").

In February 2012 he was recruited by beIN Sports as a star presenter for the June 2012 launch of this new sports station and went on to work on the coverage of the Champions League, Europa League and European club football. Tulett also hosted beIN's Lunch Time, a daily sports program broadcast Mondays to Fridays in the middle of the day in the early days of the station.
Tulett has been the anchorman for a series of major sports competitions on beIN SPORTS channels, including the 2012 Olympics, Wimbledon and the football World Cups. He hosted popular shows around the 2018 World Cup and Euro 2016 and 2020.

References

1965 births
English sportswriters
People from Shoreham-by-Sea
English television presenters
Al Jazeera people
Living people
People from Lancing, West Sussex